Orthogonius sulcatus is a species of ground beetle in the subfamily Orthogoniinae. It was described by Schmidt-Goebel in 1846.

References

sulcatus
Beetles described in 1846